Davide Succi (born 11 October 1981, in Bologna) is an Italian footballer, who plays for Hamrun Spartans.

Career
Davide Succi started his professional career at Chievo. He was co-owned with A.C. Milan and later Genoa C.F.C. He was on loan to various Serie C1 clubs and briefly for Calcio Como in Serie B. He played his only Serie A game, in an away match that Chievo lost 0–1 to Brescia, on 6 November 2004. He left on loan again to Lucchese of Serie C1 in January 2005. In June 2005, Chievo got full ownership of the player, but left on loan to Ravenna in summer 2005.

After winning promotion to Serie B, and Chievo relegated to Serie B, Ravenna bought Succi permanently.

Palermo
On 1 September 2008 he was signed by Palermo in a co-ownership deal for €1.75 million in 5-year contract, only a few days after having eliminated the rosanero from the 2008–09 Coppa Italia by scoring both goals in a surprising 2–1 away win for Ravenna.

In his first full season in the Italian top flight, Succi scored a total four goals, several of them coming on the pitch during games. On 23 November he scored his first Serie A goal, a late equalizer in a 1–1 away tie against his hometown club Bologna; this was followed by another equalizer, the second rosanero goal in an unexpected 2–2 draw at San Siro against league toppers Inter. Since then scored two more goals, again against Bologna, and then Cagliari. In June 2009 Palermo bought Succi outright for another €1.3 million, made the company had a special financial income of €450,000 for the discount.

On 26 January 2010 Bologna signed the striker on loan from Palermo until June 2010, with an option for the rossoblu to sign the player permanently for €3.5 million. In July 2010, Bologna announced they were not interested in buying Succi, and Palermo successively agreed for a season loan to Serie B club Padova later in August. Again, the club had an option to sign Succi in co-ownership deal for €500,000.

Padova did not excised the option to sign Succi, however on 31 August 2011 Succi returned to Padua in another temporary deal.

On 6 July 2012 Succi moved to Cesena, in Serie B. On 4 July 2013 he signed a new 3-year contract with Cesena. He made a total 35 appearances with five goals in the 2013–14 season, winning promotion back to Serie A with his club.

References

External links
US Palermo player profile 

1981 births
Living people
Italian footballers
Italian expatriate footballers
A.C. ChievoVerona players
Calcio Padova players
Como 1907 players
S.P.A.L. players
S.S.D. Lucchese 1905 players
Ravenna F.C. players
Palermo F.C. players
Bologna F.C. 1909 players
A.C. Cesena players
Forlì F.C. players
Serie A players
Serie B players
Serie C players
Indian Super League players
Maltese Premier League players
Expatriate footballers in India
Association football forwards
Footballers from Bologna
Ħamrun Spartans F.C. players
Italian expatriate sportspeople in Malta
Italian expatriate sportspeople in India
Expatriate footballers in Malta